Chasmagnathus convexus is a common mud-flat crab of the family Varunidae, which is endemic to East Asia. In Japan, this crab is commonly called hamagani. This crab has two forms that differ in color; one is olive green and the other is purple. Differences in diet are believed to be responsible for the color variation between the two forms. It is predominantly nocturnal.

References

Grapsoidea
Monotypic decapod genera
Taxa named by Wilhem de Haan